South Britain is a term which was occasionally used in the 17th and 18th centuries, for England and Wales in relation to their position in the southern half of the island of Great Britain. It was used mainly by Scottish writers, in apposition to the term "North Britain", which generally referred to Scotland.

Origins
Early uses of the designation have been noted after the 1603 Union of the Crowns of the Kingdoms of England and Scotland. King James VI & I used the terms "South Britain" and "North Britain" for England (and, implicitly, Wales) and Scotland respectively, most famously in his Proclamation of 1606 (here) establishing the first Union Flag, where Scotland and England are not otherwise named:

This usage was repeated in Charles I's Proclamation of 1634 on the use of the flag, though adding England and Scotland too for explanation:

See also
 North–South divide in the United Kingdom

References

History of the British Isles
Regions of the United Kingdom
Early Modern Scotland
Early Modern England
17th century in England
17th century in Wales
18th century in Wales